Maurice Taillandier (27 January 1881 – 28 December 1932) was a French fencer. He competed in the team sabre competition at the 1924 and 1928 Summer Olympics.

References

External links
 

1881 births
1932 deaths
French male sabre fencers
Olympic fencers of France
Fencers at the 1924 Summer Olympics
Fencers at the 1928 Summer Olympics